The Team Tango Foxtrot, or Foxtrot 4, is an American amateur-built aircraft, designed and produced by Team Tango of Williston, Florida. The aircraft is supplied as a kit for amateur construction, with or without factory builder assistance.

Design and development
The Foxtrot was developed as a four-seat version of the Tango 2 and shares many of the two-seater's features. The Foxtrot has a cantilever low-wing, a four-seat enclosed cockpit, fixed tricycle landing gear and a single engine in tractor configuration. The rear seats have limited visibility.

The aircraft is made from composites.

Operational history
By October 2012 three examples had been registered in the United States with the Federal Aviation Administration.

Specifications (Foxtrot)

References

External links

Photo of a Foxtrot

Homebuilt aircraft
Single-engined tractor aircraft
Team Tango aircraft
Low-wing aircraft